Airline is a British television series produced by Yorkshire Television for the ITV network in 1982. The series starred Roy Marsden as Jack Ruskin, a pilot demobbed after the end of the Second World War who starts his own air transport business.

Airline was created by Wilfred Greatorex and lasted for one series of nine episodes broadcast in January and February 1982, with a repeat in the summer of 1984. Other leading cast members were Polly Hemingway, Richard Heffer, Nicholas Bond-Owen, Sean Scanlan and Terence Rigby, while noted guest stars included Anthony Valentine and Walter Gotell (better known for his numerous guest stints as KGB General Gogol in a string of James Bond films during the Cold War era).

Production
The main location filming was at the former RAF Rufforth in Yorkshire, former RAF Duxford airfield in Cambridgeshire and on the island of Malta.

The aerial unit was managed by the Aces High Company, who operated two C-47/DC-3 aircraft for the series: "G-AGIV"/'Alice' (former USAAF and Spanish Air Force C-47A G-BHUB, now in the American Air Museum in Britain at the Imperial War Museum Duxford, painted in its original markings as "W7"/43-15509) – which featured a postwar drop-down airliner door – and the famous C-47A G-DAKS, which was previously used by the Royal Aircraft Establishment and had an extended nose originally used to test Ferranti / Marconi radar for the English Electric Lightning. This aircraft was retired by the RAE and ferried to RAF Catterick's Fire Training Ground to be used as a fire training aid but was saved by Mike Woodlet of Aces High at the last minute, being purchased by him from the UK Ministry of Defence. The extended nose was replaced at Duxford by Aces High's chief engineer to enable the aircraft to appear as "G-AGHY"/'Vera Lynn'. During production, a Taylorcraft Auster and a North American Harvard, rented from private owners, also featured, as did shots of grounded / stored Douglas DC-3's in Malta which were used for the Berlin Airlift scenes in the final episode.

Later events

Although originally planned as a long running series which could run up to the present day, the series ended up being cut short. Towards the end of the production of Airline, Greatorex objected to the editing of the series, which he saw as Yorkshire TV engaging in unauthorised script rewrites. As a result only nine episodes were made. A second series of Airline was planned to start filming in 1983 and additional aircraft had been purchased by Aces High for the production (including the Lockheed Constellation now at the Science Museum at Wroughton) but the dispute resulted in the series being axed by Yorkshire Television. Aces High subsequently moved operations to North Weald airfield in Essex, donating G-BHUB to the IWM and the Constellation to Wroughton, where both remain on display today.

In 1987 the main characters from Airline (along with the theme music by Tony Hatch) appeared in adverts for shares in British Airports Authority. Wilfred Greatorex was unaware until he saw them appear on television, and subsequently took legal action against the advertising agency over his intellectual property.

C-47A G-DAKS can now be frequently seen on BBC's Top Gear programme, normally parked next to the Boeing 747 on the hard standing behind the show's race track. The main Top Gear studios are located at Dunsfold Park Aerodrome, which has also been Aces High's base since moving from North Weald in the early 2000s.
G-DAKS is still regularly flown for TV and movie work, now on the American register as N147DC

DVD release
The complete series of Airline is available on DVD in the UK.

Episode list

References

External links
 

Television series by Yorkshire Television
ITV television dramas
Television series by ITV Studios
Television series set in the 1940s
Aviation television series
1980s British drama television series
1982 British television series debuts
1982 British television series endings
English-language television shows